Dar Bae Naw is a 2003 Burmese comedy drama film starring Dwe, Nine Nine, Nandar Hlaing and Kyi Lae Lae Oo.

Cast
Dwe
Nine Nine
Nandar Hlaing
Kyi Lae Lae Oo
Cho Pyone
Nwae Nwae San
Kutho
Kyaw Htoo
U Maung Maung Myint
Win Naing (Art)
Yan Paing Soe
U Yè Maung
Tin Tin Hla
Aye Aye Khaing
Daw Ei Ei Soe

Plot
Friends, Kyaw Zin Thant, Htoo Ye and Lin Win are childhood classmates. After graduating, they joined the same company.

Kyaw Zin Thant has a girlfriend by the name of Thet Mon Myint. Likewise, Htoo Ye also has a girlfriend by the name of Swe Swe Lei. But for Lin Win, being indecisive and fickle minded go out with a lot of girls but still has no steady girlfriend.

Kyaw Zin Thant is always commenting about Htoo Ye favoring Swe Swe Lei most of the time and Lin Win's majority of the time being preoccupied with women chasing. As for him, Kyaw Zin Thant wants his marriage to be a systematically planned life event. And is always boasting to his friends about how he would shape Thet Mon Myint into his ideal wife and not favor her every wishes.

But what Kyaw Zin Thant does not know is that, Thet Mon Myint also has the same ideas as him of molding him into her ideal husband and wants to control him after the marriage. Both having hidden agendas, they both tried to be as nice as possible to each other during their courtship and all was smooth. As planned, Kyaw Zin Thant and Thet Mon Myint tied the knot. As for Htoo Ye and Swe Swe Lei, they had to delay their wedding because of Swe Swe Lei's father's health condition.

As for the newly weds, Kyaw Zin Thant slowly realized that he could no change Thet Mon Myint as he has expected. Thet Mon Myint on the other hand tried to change Kyaw Zin Thant. But the difference is that Kyaw Zin Thant has to give way to Thet Mon most of the time as she is always enticing him to get what she wants.

The first rule of Thet Mon Myint is that Kyaw Zin Thant to give a detail account of his whole day activity every night. Kyaw Zin Thant also agrees to this arrangement, as he could not overthrow the wordy Thet Mon Myint. Along with this arrangement Thet Mon Myint segregates what is wrong and what is right of Kyaw Zin Thant account. As it goes by Thet Mon Myint ordered Kyaw Zin Thant that from the next day onwards, only the spinster Daw Tin Tin Aye can go into his office and no other women are allowed to go in. But still Kyaw Zin Thant is happy as he is loving Thet Mon Myint more than he used to as days goes by.

On the next day the careless spinster Daw Tin Tin Aye accidentally stained her lipstick shade on Kyaw Zin Thant shirt and Thet Mon Myint throw tantrums about it. The boasting Kyaw Zin Thant had to pacify They Mon Myint and give way to her again. But on the next day when he went to the office met Htoo Ye, he advised him not to give way to Swe Swe Lei.

Thet Mon Myint also did not get along well with the helpers at their place. No one could tolerate Thet Mon Myint's fussiness and all left citing many different reasons. The end result was that there were no helpers at their place. But Kyaw Zin Thant could not let his friends Htoo Ye and Lin Win know about this as he have over spoken about how to treat women and always commenting them their soft spot of giving way to women.

But the matter could not be hidden from them in the long term. One day Htoo Ye and Lin Win came to Kyaw Zin Thant place to ask him to go along with them to play golf. At that time Kyaw Zin Thant was washing the dishes and Thet Mon Myint was doing flower arrangement in the living room. Kyaw Zin Thant quickly hid his plight and sternly scold Thet Mon Myint in front of them. But he did not go along with his friend to the golf course. Still Thet Mon Myint showed petulance again and Kyaw Zin Thant had to pacify her after Htoo Ye and Lin Win have left. He explained that he does not want his friends to have the impression that he is afraid of his wife and promised to agree to all her wishes behind the curtains.

Hanging on to this new promise they went to the market to shop and Thet Mon Myint quarreled with the poultry seller because the weight charged was not correct. After that event when Kyaw Zin Thant sadly disclose his plight at the office, the clerk Ya Mone promised to take him to her friend who is an agent for engaging helpers. Kyaw Zin Thant went along with her.

Arriving there they met Thet Mon Myint and Swe Swe Lei who were already there. Thet Mon Myint misunderstood Kyaw Zin Thant with Ya Mone and accused him. The angry Kyaw Zin Thant left the house.

While Kyaw Zin Thant was away, Thet Mon Myint's cousin Aung Myin Thu came for a visit and stayed at their house. Without knowing each other the biggest misunderstanding happens and the elders at the areas called the police. The police mistakenly took Aung Myin Thu away.

Learning of the drift between Kyaw Zin Thant and Thet Mon Myint, their parents came down to Yangon and arrange to patch things up between them. As they are pretending to stand tough at the current position, both parents ordered them to go back together with them to their respective native towns.

Watch the movie and find out how fate will twist the two couples, Kyaw Zin Thant & Thet Mon Myint and Htoo Ye & Swe Swe Lei.

Release
It was released on February 28, 2003.

References

2003 films
2003 drama films
Burmese drama films
2000s Burmese-language films